The Bob Clampett Show is an animation anthology television series which ran from 2000 to 2001. The show features animated theatrical shorts from the Warner Bros. library that were animated or directed by Bob Clampett, as well as a selection of shorts from the Beany and Cecil animated television series. It originally was produced by and aired on Cartoon Network, with reruns airing at the tail end of Cartoon Network's Adult Swim block in the mid-2000s. Twenty-six episodes were made in all.

This was one of two animated anthology shows on Cartoon Network (joining The Popeye Show) that aired uncut and uncensored shorts, as well as shorts that would normally get little to no airtime on American TV due to racially insensitive and outdated content (such as "Russian Rhapsody" and "Bacall to Arms"), though "Kristopher Kolumbus, Jr.", the 1938 version of "Injun Trouble" (ironically, its color remake, "Wagon Heels" aired), and the Censored Eleven shorts "Coal Black and de Sebben Dwarves" and "Tin Pan Alley Cats" were the only Bob Clampett shorts that never aired on the show; the version of "Farm Frolics" shown was the Blue Ribbon Merrie Melodies reissue with a missing tobacco spitting joke and a truncated beginning that, as of 2023, was found; and, while there was mention of the violent "director's cut" ending of "Hare Ribbin'", the version that aired had the general release ending instead.

The show's opening title sequence was nominated for an Annie Award in 2000 in the category "Outstanding Achievement in An Animated Special Project", but it lost to The Scooby-Doo Project.

Episodes

Season 1
All shorts featured this season were produced by Warner Bros.

Season 2
This season features a mix between Warner Bros. shorts and Beany & Cecil shorts. All Beany & Cecil shorts are marked with an asterisk (*), otherwise all shorts are produced by Warner Bros.

See also
 Cartoon Alley
 Looney Tunes and Merrie Melodies filmography
 ToonHeads
 The Popeye Show
 The Tex Avery Show

References

External links
 

2000s American animated television series
2000s American anthology television series
2000 American television series debuts
2001 American television series endings
American children's animated anthology television series
Cartoon Network original programming
English-language television shows